OGRA may refer to:
 Oil and Gas Regulatory Authority, an agency of the government of Pakistan
 Ogra, a commune in Mureș County, Transylvania, Romania
 Online Gambling Regulation Act 2001, legislation underpinning the Isle of Man Gambling Supervision Commission